Pablo Elías Pedraza Bustos (born 10 March 1995) is a Bolivian professional footballer who plays for Barnechea in the Primera B de Chile.

Club career
In 2008 Pedraza began his career at the youth sector of Club Blooming. During 2011 he started training with the first team, and made his top flight debut the following year. In July 2015, he was hoping to get more playing time; he transferred to Real Potosí as he was unable to secure a place on the first team due to his inexperience.

International career
Pedraza was summoned for the Bolivian U-20 team to play in the 2015 South American Youth Football Championship. He was the team captain in the four matches that Bolivia played in the first round of the tournament.

He was named in Bolivia's senior squad for a 2018 FIFA World Cup qualifier against Ecuador in October 2015.

References

External links

1995 births
Living people
Sportspeople from Santa Cruz de la Sierra
Association football central defenders
Bolivian footballers
Bolivian expatriate footballers
Club Blooming players
Club Real Potosí players
The Strongest players
A.C. Barnechea footballers
Primera B de Chile players
Expatriate footballers in Chile
2015 South American Youth Football Championship players
Bolivia youth international footballers